The 2021–22 Chicago State Cougars men's basketball team represented Chicago State University in the 2021–22 NCAA Division I men's basketball season. The Cougars were led by first-year head coach Gerald Gillion. They played their home games at the Emil and Patricia Jones Convocation Center as members of the Western Athletic Conference.

This was Chicago State's final season in the WAC, and a new conference has yet to be officially announced.

Previous season
In a season limited due to the ongoing COVID-19 pandemic, the Cougars finished the 2020–21 season 0–9, 0–0 in WAC play before suspending the season due to COVID-19 and an insufficient number of players.

On July 1, 2021, the school fired head coach Lance Irvin after three years at the school. On July 19, the school named Samford assistant Gerald Gillion the new head coach.

Roster

Schedule 

|-
!colspan=9 style=| Non-conference regular season

|-
!colspan=9 style=| WAC conference season

|-
!colspan=9 style=|WAC tournament

|-

Source

See also 
2021–22 Chicago State Cougars women's basketball team

References

Chicago State Cougars men's basketball seasons
Chicago State
Chicago State
Chicago State